Matthew Philip Syed (born 2 November 1970) is a British journalist, author, broadcaster and former table tennis player. He competed as an English table tennis international, and was the English number one for many years. He was three times the men's singles champion at the Commonwealth Table Tennis Championships (in 1997, 2000 and 2001), and also competed for Great Britain in two Olympic Games, at Barcelona in 1992 and at Sydney in 2000.

He also embarked on a journalism career, having worked for The Times newspaper since 1999.  He has published six books, Bounce in 2010, Black Box Thinking in 2015, The Greatest in 2017, You Are Awesome in 2018, Rebel Ideas: The Power of Diverse Thinking in 2019, and Dare to be You in 2020.

Early life
Syed was born in Reading, Berkshire.  His father, Abbas Syed, was a Pakistani immigrant to Britain who converted from Shia Islam to Christianity, and his mother is Welsh.

He attended the Maiden Erlegh School in Earley near Reading, then studied at Balliol College, Oxford, where he graduated with first-class honours in PPE in 1995.

Sporting career
A right-handed table-tennis player, Syed was the top ranked player in England for nearly 10 years.  He won many titles with his usually defensive style.  He reached his top world ranking of 25 at the end of 1998.

He reached the final of the European Youth Championships in 1985, losing to Dmitry Mazunov.  He was a member of the English team that won the European title in 1986.

He represented Great Britain in the men's singles at the 1992 Olympics in Barcelona and the 2000 Olympic Games in Sydney, but failed to reach the second knockout stage each time.  He says that he "choked" at the Sydney Olympics: "when I walked out into the mega-watt light of the competition arena, I could hardly hit the ball."

He was English champion four times, in 1997, 1998, 2000 and 2001.  He also won the men's singles event at three consecutives Commonwealth Table Tennis Championships, in 1997 in Glasgow, 2000 in Singapore and 2001 in Delhi, and also won three titles as a member of the English men's team in 1994, 1997 and 2000.  He was also a member of the England men's team that won the gold medal at the 2002 Commonwealth Games in Manchester.

Author and commentator
Syed has worked as a commentator for the BBC and Eurosport, and as a journalist for The Times since 1999. He is a regular pundit on radio and television, commentating on sporting, cultural and political issues. His film China and Table Tennis, made for the BBC, won bronze medal at the Olympic Golden Rings ceremony in Lausanne in 2008.

Syed's style has been mocked by satirical magazine Private Eye.

In his second book, Black Box Thinking, he argues that the key to success is a positive attitude to failure; it was published by John Murray in 2015.

Syed is the co-founder of Matthew Syed Consulting. He was one of the co-founders of TTK Greenhouse, a sports-related charity.

Syed hosts a BBC Radio 5 Live podcast called Flintoff, Savage & The Ping Pong Guy. Alongside him on the podcast are ex-England cricketer Andrew Flintoff and former Blackburn Rovers captain Robbie Savage. Current sporting topics are discussed on the podcast.

In 2016 he was awarded an honorary doctorate in Liberal Arts by Abertay University in Dundee.

His book You Are Awesome was published in 2018. The publisher describes it as "a positive and empowering guide to help children build resilience". A follow-up, Dare to be You, was released in 2020.

In 2021 he began presenting a new programme on BBC Radio 4, Sideways, about "the ideas that shape our lives".

Politics
Syed stood as the Labour candidate in the 2001 UK General Election in Wokingham, coming third in a safe Conservative seat. Syed won a place on the Labour Party's shortlist to succeed Ashok Kumar for the Middlesbrough South and East Cleveland constituency in the 2010 UK General Election. However, the party selected Tom Blenkinsop, who had worked in Kumar's constituency office for six years.

In the 2019 Conservative Party leadership election, he endorsed Jeremy Hunt.

Personal life
Syed is married to Kathy Weeks. They have a son and a daughter.

Books 
 Bounce: Mozart, Federer, Picasso, Beckham, and the science of success (HarperCollins, 2010), 
 Black Box Thinking: Why Most People Never Learn from Their Mistakes – But Some Do (Portfolio, 2015), 
 The Greatest: What Sport Teaches Us About Achieving Success (John Murray, 2017), 
 You Are Awesome: Find Your Confidence and Dare to be Brilliant at (Almost) Anything (John Murray, 2018), 
  Rebel Ideas: The Power of Diverse Thinking (John Murray, 2019), 
 Dare to Be You: Defy Self-Doubt, Fearlessly Follow Your Own Path and Be Confidently You! (Hachette Children's Group, 2020),

See also
 List of England players at the World Team Table Tennis Championships

References

External links 
 
 Erik Lindh vs. Mattew Syed – Sear's International Challenge – Video

1970 births
Living people
Alumni of Balliol College, Oxford
BBC Radio 5 Live presenters
British sportsperson-politicians
Commonwealth Games gold medallists for England
Commonwealth Games medallists in table tennis
English male journalists
English male table tennis players
English non-fiction writers
English people of Pakistani descent
English people of Welsh descent
English sportswriters
Medallists at the 2002 Commonwealth Games
Olympic table tennis players of Great Britain
People associated with the University of Abertay Dundee
People from Reading, Berkshire
Table tennis players at the 1992 Summer Olympics
Table tennis players at the 2000 Summer Olympics
Table tennis players at the 2002 Commonwealth Games
The Times people